Mutawakilu Seidu (born 8 August 1995 in Accra) is a Ghanaian professional footballer. He currently plays for Nigeria Professional Football League side  Enugu Rangers, as a goalkeeper.

Career

Youth 
Seidu began his career at Asante Kotoko junior team before being promoted to the senior team.

Hearts of Oak 
In 2014 Seidu signed for Ghana Premier League club  Accra Hearts of Oak in his hometown Accra.

Dreams FC (loan) 
In 2015, it was announced that Mutawakilu  would be joining Dreams F.C. on a season-long loan, with an option to make the transfer permanent.

Enugu Rangers 
In April 2017, Seidu joined seven-time Nigeria Premier League Champions Enugu Rangers on a two-year deal.

International 
On 6 January 2015, Seidu was called up to the Ghana U-20, and was part of the Ghana U-20 team at the 2015 African U-20 Championship in Senegal.

He represented the Ghana U-20 at the FIFA U20 World Cup in New Zealand in 2015.

Honour

Club
Enugu Rangers
Nigerian FA Cup (1): Winner 2018

References

External links

1995 births
Living people
Ghanaian Muslims
Ghanaian footballers
Ghanaian expatriate footballers
Association football goalkeepers
Footballers from Accra
Ghana Premier League players
Ghanaian expatriate sportspeople in Nigeria
Expatriate footballers in Nigeria
Ghana under-20 international footballers
Accra Hearts of Oak S.C. players
Nigeria Professional Football League players
Rangers International F.C. players